Montsant, a mountain range in Catalonia, Spain
Montsant DO, a certain wine quality from the Montsant region, Spain